Tom Kimbrough Stadium is a 9,800-capacity multi-use high school football stadium in Murphy, Texas. Mostly used for high school football, soccer, and track, the stadium was built in 2003 and is owned by the Plano Independent School District. It is the home stadium of Plano East Senior High School.

Namesake
The stadium was named after Tom Kimbrough, the former Head Football Coach of Plano Senior High School and Plano ISD Athletic Director after John Clark (John Clark Stadium was named after him).
Kimbrough was inspired by Clark, the former coach and PISD Athletics Director who hired him, and maintained his high standards. Under his direction, the Plano Wildcats football team won three state championship games. 

He stated that: The greatest honor of my career has been the opportunity to share with young people an appreciation of the values of perseverance, teamwork, discipline and respect. These certainly outweigh wins and losses and state championships.

External links
 Information at Texas Bob - Football stadiums
 Kimbrough Stadium Landing Page

American football venues in the Dallas–Fort Worth metroplex
Athletics (track and field) venues in Texas
High school football venues in Texas
Soccer venues in Texas
Sports venues completed in 2003
Buildings and structures in Collin County, Texas